Chosi Dam is a gravity dam located in Shimane Prefecture in Japan. The dam is used for flood control and water supply. The catchment area of the dam is 7.8 km2. The dam impounds about 20  ha of land when full and can store 2530 thousand cubic meters of water. The construction of the dam was started on 1987 and completed in 1999.

References

Dams in Shimane Prefecture
1999 establishments in Japan